Louis Weissbein (1831-1913) was a German-born American architect practicing in Boston, Massachusetts.

Life and career
Louis Weissbein was born July 19, 1831, to Michael A. Weissbein and Johanna (Basch) Weissbein in Krotoschin, then under the control of Prussia but historically and presently a part of Poland. He was educated in a local school and studied with a government architect, followed by two years at the Bauakademie in Berlin. In 1854 he immigrated to the United States, settling in Boston. For four years he worked as a draftsman for various architects, including Richard Bond and Nathaniel J. Bradlee. In 1858 he established his own office in Boston. He was a sole practitioner until 1883, when he formed a partnership with William Hatch Jones, who had joined Weissbein as a draftsman circa 1869. The firm of Weissbein & Jones was active until Jones' death in 1903. Weissbein then returned to private practice, retiring shortly before his death.

Weissbein was a Republican. During his term as Mayor of Boston, Hugh O'Brien proposed to appoint him City Architect of Boston, though he declined. In 1891 he was appointed to the Board of Commissioners of Prisons by Governor William E. Russell, and he resigned in 1894. Weissbein was a member of the American Institute of Architects from 1870 until 1895, and became a Fellow in 1889.

Personal life
Weissbein was Jewish, and may have been the first Jewish architect to practice in Boston. He was one of the best-known German residents of Boston, and was a leader in local German society and philanthropy. For fifty years he was a member of the Orpheus Musical Society, a German singing society, and was president for twenty two years.

Weissbein never married. He died December 10, 1913, in Boston. At his death he bequeathed four thousand dollars to the Massachusetts Institute of Technology to support scholarships for Jewish students.

Legacy
Weissbein's major works include the original buildings of Boston College and Temple Israel, the latter of which is the oldest synagogue building in Massachusetts. He also designed a concentration of large buildings, including the courthouse, in Pittsfield, Massachusetts, one of which has been listed on the United States National Register of Historic Places. Many of his other works contribute to listed historic districts.

Architectural works
 Boston College (former), 761 Harrison Ave, Boston, Massachusetts (1858–60)
 Washington Building, 387 Washington St, Boston, Massachusetts (1859, demolished)
 Public Library of Brookline, 361 Washington St, Brookline, Massachusetts (1866–69, demolished)
 House for Louis Prang, 29 Centre St, Roxbury, Boston, Massachusetts (1867)
 L. Prang & Company factory, 1 Gardner St, Roxbury, Boston, Massachusetts (1867 et seq)
 Berkshire Life Insurance Company Building, 5 North St, Pittsfield, Massachusetts (1868, altered 1911, NRHP 1986)
 Berkshire County Courthouse, 76 East St, Pittsfield, Massachusetts (1869–71, altered 1908)
 Berkshire County House of Correction, 264 2nd St, Pittsfield, Massachusetts (1869–71)
 Fire Station No. 1, 140 Washington St, Brookline, Massachusetts (1870–71, demolished 1907)
 Academy of Music, 160-196 North St, Pittsfield, Massachusetts (1872, burned 1912)
 Four houses for George Wheatland Jr., 225, 227, 229 and 231 Marlborough St, Boston, Massachusetts (1873–74)
 Dudley School, Roxbury, Boston, Massachusetts (1874, demolished)
 Hotel Comfort, 10 Williams St, Roxbury, Boston, Massachusetts (1877–78)
 House for Henry Schreiber, 175 Poplar St, Roslindale, Boston, Massachusetts (1879)
 Morse Block, 58-72 South St, Boston, Massachusetts (1880–83, demolished)
 House for J. Avery Richards, 103 Newbury St, Boston, Massachusetts (1881, altered)
 Blake and Osborne Building, 118 South St, Boston, Massachusetts (1883)
 House for Leopold Morse, Boston, Massachusetts (1884–85, altered 1929)
 Hecht Building, 207-209 Federal St, Boston, Massachusetts (1885–86, burned 1893)
 Hotel Dunbar, 2401 Washington St, Roxbury, Boston, Massachusetts (1885–86, burned 1982)
 Temple Israel (former), 600 Columbus Ave, Boston, Massachusetts (1885)
 Soldiers' Home addition, Chelsea, Massachusetts (1889–90, demolished)
 Waterman Block, 2328 Washington St, Roxbury, Boston, Massachusetts (1890)
 Elysium Club, 218 Huntington Ave, Boston, Massachusetts (1891, demolished)
 Hecht Building, 207-221 Federal St, Boston, Massachusetts (1893, demolished)
 W. L. Lockhart & Company factory, 120 1st St, Cambridge, Massachusetts (1902, demolished)

Gallery of architectural works

Notes

References

1831 births
1913 deaths
Architects from Boston
German emigrants to the United States
Fellows of the American Institute of Architects